The Naval Submarine Medical Research Laboratory (NSMRL) is located on the New London Submarine Base in Groton, Connecticut. The laboratory's mission is to sustain the readiness and superiority of our undersea warriors through innovative health and performance research.  It is a subordinate command of the Naval Medical Research Center.

History and overview
The laboratory was established during World War II to study night vision, sonar sound discrimination, and personnel selection. Today it continues in the areas of undersea warfighter health and performance, submarine atmospheric monitoring, bioeffects of underwater sound and blast, submariner psychological fitness, submarine human systems integration, diving and hyberbaric research, submarine survival, escape, and rescue, hearing conservation, and undersea health epidemiology. Its achievements include:
 Sea Lab 1 habitat project
 Disabled Submarine Escape and Rescue project
 "Rig-for-red" viewing
 Development of the International Orange color (Air-Sea Rescue Red)
 Studies of hyperbaric nitrogen narcosis
 Development of saturation diving and decompression tables
 Performance-based screening of color vision
 Personnel screening and assessment for enclosed environments
 Effects of atmospheric conditions on health and performance in enclosed environments
 Underwater acoustic signal discrimination and classification
 Bioeffects of underwater sound
 Search and rescue

NSMRL is located in Groton, Connecticut near the mouth of the Thames River and Long Island Sound.

Facilities
 Two hyperbaric chambers, saturation and hypobaric capability
 1000 m3 anechoic chamber
 145 m3 reverberant chamber
 Ten sound-proof audio testing booths
 Vision and auditory research suites
 Technical library
 Waterfront access (submarines and diving)
 Diving work boat

The NSMRL auditory laboratory includes a large, 1,000 m3 anechoic chamber. The suspended cable floor and fiberglass wedges provide an "echo-free" environment that is essential for efforts on spatialized auditory displays and transducer evaluation. Additionally, there are ten instrumented sound-proof booths and a reverberant room. These facilities are integral to the work on human-machine interfaces, combat systems displays, hearing conservation, audio signal enhancement, noise reduction techniques, and diver hearing.

The laboratory has a 142 m3 enclosed atmosphere testing environment and facilities for cardiopulmonary and metabolic workload assessment. It also has maintained close collaboration with the Royal Navy and its facilities at Alverstoke, England on several projects. NSMRL's diving research program is supported by a saturation diving chamber certified to pressures simulating 350 fsw and a fully instrumented hyperbaric treatment chamber. Both chambers are capable of supporting multi-diver teams and associated medical, physiological, and exercise equipment. The laboratory also maintains an enclosed 25-foot Boston Whaler equipped with GPS and radar to support open water diving research.

Library
Many of the NSMRL publications have been scanned and are available online at the Rubicon Research Repository. Other articles can be found in the DUMC Archive finding aids of the Undersea and Hyperbaric Medical Society library collection.

See also

 Institute of Naval Medicine, of the Royal Navy

References

Other external links
NSMRL website
Undersea and Hyperbaric Medical Society
Rubicon Research Repository
DUMC Archive

Armed forces diving
Diving medicine organizations
Diving organizations
Buildings and structures in Groton, Connecticut
United States Navy installations

Military medical organizations of the United States
Military medical research of the United States Navy

Medical and health organizations based in Connecticut